Weymer Creek Provincial Park, formerly Weymer Creek Karst Provincial Park, is a provincial park located on the west coast of Vancouver Island in British Columbia, Canada, just southeast of the community of Tahsis in the region of Nootka Sound. Its most important feature is its karst topography and some of the deepest caves in Canada. Caving is currently not permitted in the park and visitors to the area are requested to practice "no trace" camping.

References

External links
 BC Parks webpage

Provincial parks of British Columbia
Nootka Sound region
Karst
Caves of British Columbia